Peratomixis miranda is a species of tephritid or fruit flies in the genus Peratomixis of the family Tephritidae.

Distribution
Lesotho.

References

Tephritinae
Insects described in 1947
Diptera of Africa